Nai basti  نئ بستى is a neighborhood located in Anantnag district, Jammu and Kashmir, India. It is the hub of coaching institutes and schools.
It is located half a kilometer from Lal Chowk, the nerve of the town.
It is the Gateway of Anantnag town. NH-1B passes through Nai Basti area. 
The Important educational establishments in the area are:-
 
1. Euro Presentation
2. Hista Hr secondary
3. Saint Xains International School
4. New Era High School
5. Blossom Public School
6. Euro Kids .

It also has few private hospitals:-
1. Al Noor hospital
2. Gousia hospital
3. Mid City hospital

The important coaching centres are:-

1 ACIT - Academy of Commerce and Information Technology
2 Usmania Coaching Center 
3 Eternal Coaching Center 
4 Axis Coaching Center 
5 Bright Future Institute

References

Anantnag district